Halden Dagblad was a free newspaper published in Halden, Norway.

It was owned 100% by A-pressen. It was established with the purpose of competing with Halden Arbeiderblad in the advertising market.

It was closed in 2009.

References

2000 establishments in Norway
2009 disestablishments in Norway
Amedia
Defunct free daily newspapers
Defunct newspapers published in Norway
Mass media in Halden
Norwegian-language newspapers
Newspapers established in 2000
Publications disestablished in 2009